Topsy Phiri (born 11 August 1980) is a Zambian male badminton player. In 2015, he placed second at the Chinese Ambassadors Badminton Championship in the men's doubles event with Donald Mabo. He was the men's doubles runner-up at Top 16 Badminton Championship in Lusaka. In the mixed doubles, he also the runner-up at the Ethiopia International tournament with Elizaberth Chipeleme.

Achievements

BWF International Challenge/Series
Mixed Doubles

 BWF International Challenge tournament
 BWF International Series tournament
 BWF Future Series tournament

References

External links
 

1980 births
Living people
Zambian male badminton players